Microtheoris is a genus of moths of the family Crambidae.

Species
Microtheoris ophionalis (Walker, 1859)
Microtheoris vibicalis (Zeller, 1873)

Former species
Microtheoris sesquialteralis (Zeller, 1873)

References

Natural History Museum Lepidoptera genus database

Odontiini
Crambidae genera
Taxa named by Edward Meyrick